The 2002 season was the Miami Dolphins' 33rd in the National Football League, their 37th overall and their third under head coach Dave Wannstedt. The Dolphins failed to improve upon their previous season's output of 11–5, winning only nine games. The team missed the playoffs for the first time since 1996.

In the off-season, the Dolphins acquired running back Ricky Williams from the New Orleans Saints. Despite the team not making the playoffs, he led the league with a career-high 16 rushing touchdowns. Williams made the Pro Bowl following the season, taking home the game's MVP honors. It was Williams' only Pro Bowl appearance of his career.

Offseason

NFL Draft

Undrafted free agents

Staff

Roster

Regular season

Schedule

Game summaries

Week 1: vs. Detroit Lions

Week 2: at Indianapolis Colts

Week 3: vs. New York Jets

Week 4: at Kansas City Chiefs

Week 5: vs. New England Patriots

Week 6: at Denver Broncos

Week 7: vs. Buffalo Bills

Week 9: at Green Bay Packers

Week 10: at New York Jets

Week 11: vs. Baltimore Ravens

Week 12: vs. San Diego Chargers

Week 13: at Buffalo Bills

Week 14: vs. Chicago Bears

Week 15: vs. Oakland Raiders

Week 16: at Minnesota Vikings

Week 17: at New England Patriots

Standings

References

Miami Dolphins seasons
Miami Dolphins
Miami Dolphins